Designated Special Character schools were created under the New Zealand Education Act of 1989 which allows the Minister of Education to establish two types of special character schools under Sections 155 and 156 of the act. The Ministry of Education defines a Designated Special Character School as "a state school that has a particular character which sets it apart from ordinary state schools and kura kaupapa Māori. The only students who may enrol at a designated character school are those whose parents accept the particular character of the school."

Section 155 schools
Kura Kaupapa Māori (Māori-language immersion schools), where the principal language of instruction is Māori. Kura Kaupapa Māori differ from the earlier Kohanga reo in that Kohanga reo are immersion kindergartens whereas Kura Kaupapa Māori are immersion schools.

 Te Kura o Waikare
 Nga Taiatea Wharekura
 Te Kura o Hirangi
 Te Kura o Torere
 Te Kura Toitu o Te Whaiti-nui-a-Toi
 Te Kura Kaupapa Motuhake o Tawhiuau
 Mana Tamariki
 Te Kura o Te Whakatupuranga Rua Mano
 Te Kura Maori o Porirua

In 2018, some of New Zealand's twelve approved Partnership Schools (a version of charter school) successfully applied to become designated special character schools after the newly formed coalition government set about removing legislation from the New Zealand Education Act allowing for charter schools.

Section 156 schools
These are identified as Designated Character Schools, under Section 156. The special character of schools established under this section is not specified in the Act, and parents may propose any desirable special character as long as no other local school is already delivering an education reflecting the same special character.
 Ao Tawhiti
 Te Whanau o Tupuranga

References

Designated Special Character schools